The 2005–06 LEN Trophy was the 14th edition of LEN's second-tier competition for men's water polo clubs.

Knockout stage

Eight Finals

|}

Quarter-finals

Semi-finals

Final

See also
2005–06 LEN Euroleague

References
 LEN-kupa 2005–2006 nemzetisport.hu

2005 in water polo
2006 in water polo